Menara Matahari (Indonesian for "Matahari Tower") is a 41-storey, -high commercial office and residential skyscraper located at Palem Raya Boulevard 7 in Lippo Karawaci, Tangerang, Indonesia.

Description 
Menara Matahari is located directly next to the Universitas Pelita Harapan (UPH) campus / Times Bookstore, and across the street from Benton Junction (restaurant strip) and Supermal Karawaci. It is the tallest office building in Lippo Karawaci.  Entrance to the office buildings is located on Palem Raya Blvd.; entrance to the residences is at the rear toward UPH.  Entry  to the residential area requires a passkey.

Occupants

Residential Side 
Apartments
FoodMart Convenience Store (lobby level)
Prima Laundry & Dry Cleaning (located inside FoodMart; lobby level)
Ngopi Time (coffee shop and restaurant)

Commercial Side 
UNO Cafe (lobby level)
James Riady's Art Collection, 3rd Floor
AIG
Lippo Group marketing gallery
Aerotravel / PT Satriavi Travel Service
PT Matahari Putra Prima, Tbk. (parent company of Matahari and Hypermart)
Multipolar
PT Maxx Coffee Prima

Notes

References
Emporis Property Listing, 

Residential skyscrapers in Indonesia
Buildings and structures in Banten
Skyscraper office buildings in Indonesia